Snoek is a Dutch surname. Meaning "pike" in Dutch, it may be a metaphorical name or metonymic occupational surname (referring to a fisherman). However, in Zeeland Snoek was also a common given name in the Middle Ages and the name may be patronymic in origin. Varian forms are Snoeck and Snoeks. People with the surname include:

Andries Snoek (1766–1829), Dutch tragedy actor
 Hans Snoek (1910–2001), Dutch dancer, choreographer and ballet director
 (1902–1950), Dutch physicist and crystallographer, known e.g. for the 
 (1896–1981), Dutch track cyclist
 Hendrik Snoek, German show jumper and businessman
 Paul Snoek (1933–1981), Belgian poet

Snoeck
  (1885–1946), Dutch violinist and conductor
 (1834–1898), Belgian collector of musical instruments
 Henri Snoeck (fl. 1920), Belgian Olympic wrestler
 Jan Snoeck (1927–2018), Dutch sculptor and ceramist

Snoeks
 Daniel Snoeks (born 1994), Australian model and television personality in Korea
 Jiske Snoeks (born 1978), Dutch field hockey player
 Kelvin Snoeks (born 1987), Dutch racing driver

See also
Snoecks, a Belgian magazine
Snook (disambiguation)
Snook (surname)

References

Dutch-language surnames